WAAJ (89.7 FM) is a contemporary Christian–formatted radio station licensed to Benton, Kentucky, United States, and serving the Jackson Purchase area of western Kentucky, including Paducah. The station is owned by Heartland Ministries, Inc. as part of a triopoly with Southern Gospel station WTRT (88.1 FM) and Christian radio station WVHM (90.5 FM). All three stations share studios on College Street in downtown Hardin, Kentucky, while its transmitter facilites are located off Cedar Knob Road in rural Marshall County, Kentucky southeast of Benton and northeast of Hardin.

History
The station originally signed on in November 1996 with a Christian Contemporary format under the branding The J-FM. In 206 it switched formats to Bluegrass/Folk music. Then in October 2014, it returned to its original Christian Contemporary format.

References

External links
WAAJ's official website

AAJ
Marshall County, Kentucky
1996 establishments in Kentucky
Radio stations established in 1996